Prays nephelomima, the citrus flower moth, is a moth of the  family Plutellidae. It is found in Australia (New South Wales and southern Queensland). It was first recorded as being present in New Zealand in 1975.

The wingspan is about 10 mm.

The larvae are a pest on Citrus species. They bore into the petals or receptacle of the flower buds of their host plant, causing premature flower drop or fruit distortion.

References

External links

Images of Prays nephelomima

Plutellidae
Moths of New Zealand
Moths described in 1907
Moths of Australia